John Ive (died 1409), of New Romney, Kent, was an English politician.

He was a Member (MP) of the Parliament of England for New Romney in January 1390 and 1402. He was also the common clerk and jurat of the aforementioned town.

References

14th-century births
1409 deaths
Clerks
Jurats
15th-century English politicians
14th-century English politicians
English MPs January 1390
English MPs 1402
Members of Parliament for New Romney